The chestnut-collared swallow (Petrochelidon rufocollaris) is a species of bird in the family Hirundinidae.  It is found in Ecuador and Peru.  Its natural habitats are pastureland and heavily degraded former forest.

References

chestnut-collared swallow
Birds of Ecuador
Birds of Peru
chestnut-collared swallow
Taxonomy articles created by Polbot
Taxa named by Titian Peale